Tabut may refer to:

 Tabut, an alternative transliteration of Tabbat, Bukan, a village in Iran
 Tabut, another name for Tabuik, a festival in West Sumatra
 Tabut, the name given in the Quran for The Ark of the Covenant

See also 
 Tabot, a replica of the Arks of the Covenant in Ethiopia